Outcry is a 2020 documentary mini-series written and directed by Pat Kondelis, about the real-life story of high school football star Greg Kelley, who was arrested, convicted and jailed for sexual assault of a 4-year-old boy, as well as his support system that pushed back in their quest for truth and justice.  The Showtime mini-series premiered on July 5, 2020.

Into Greg Kelley's senior year in Leander, Texas, he was arrested, convicted, and jailed for sexual assault of a four-year-old boy, and later for a second child, who both attended day care in the home where Kelley was living.  Kelley was sentenced to 25 years in prison with no possibility for parole.  In support of Kelley, a supporting groundswell emerged that called into question the small-town police force, their investigation, the prosecution's tactics, and ultimately the validity of the conviction in one of the most controversial cases the county had ever seen.

Related 

"This does not feel like freedom at all," said Kelley who was convicted of child sexual assault in 2014 to be exonerated in 2019 though it is exceedingly rare for the state's highest criminal court to overturn a conviction.

Pat Kondelis is also the director of Disgraced, a 2017 Emmy Award winning Showtime documentary about the 2003 murder of Baylor University basketball player Patrick Dennehy and the attempted, related cover-up of NCAA violations rampant in the Baylor basketball program by Coach Dave Bliss.

Reception 

Rotten Tomatoes favorably rates Outcry 89% from 9 critics and 93% from 15 users, while the Internet Movie Database rates it 8.4/10 from 690 users. Metacritic rates Outcry 78% from 5 critics.

The Guardian said, "It was a rollercoaster" and the most surprising docuseries of the summer.

The Hollywood Reporter said it was, "An effectively indignation-inducing true crime tale."

Michael Morton, who was mentioned in Outcry as also having been wrongfully convicted, expressed that the way the prosecutors are being presented in Outcry is problematic.

Decider considered whether to "Stream It Or Skip It" and called to "Stream It" as did 73.5% on their Twitter poll.

Lawyer Robert Barnes highly recommends Outcry, stating, "What's also still unsettling is that even Texas Rangers and high-ranking law enforcement officers still don't know how to prosecute a child abuse case."

See also 

 The Confession Killer, also involves problems with the Texas Rangers.
 Disgraced (2017 film), also written/directed/produced by Pat Kondelis, is an Emmy Award winning Showtime documentary on the 2003 murder of Baylor University basketball player Patrick Dennehy, the NCAA, and its scandal with Dave Bliss.
 The Scheme (2020 film), also directed by Pat Kondelis, is a documentary on basketball insider Christian Dawkins, who hustled the FBI in a scandal that threatened to take down the NCAA.
 The Radical Story of Patty Hearst, another 2018 documentary mini-series directed Pat Kondelis, is about the transformation of Patty Hearst from kidnapped heiress to well-known terrorist is a saga of privilege, celebrity and violence, from firsthand accounts over forty years later.
 Innocent prisoner's dilemma
 The Innocence Project
 List of wrongful convictions in the United States

References

External links 

 
 
 

2020 American television series debuts
2020 television documentary series
2020 television documentary series about crime
2020 television documentary series about historical events
2020 television documentary series about politics
2020 television documentary series about sex
American documentary television series about crime
American documentary television series about historical events
American documentary television series about politics
American documentary television series about sex
Crime films based on actual events
Documentary films about Texas
Documentary television series about crime in the United States
Documentary television series about historical events in the United States
Documentary television series about policing
Documentary television series about politics
Documentary television series about sexuality
2020s English-language films
Outcry